Events from the year 1572 in France.

Incumbents 
Monarch – Charles IX of France

Events
 August 18 – Huguenot King Henry III of Navarre marries Margaret of Valois, sister of King Charles and daughter of Catherine de' Medici, in a supposed attempt to reconcile Protestants and Catholics in France.
 August 24 – St. Bartholomew's Day massacre: Catholics in Paris murder thousands of Protestants, including Gaspard de Coligny and Petrus Ramus, at the order of King Charles IX with Catherine de' Medici's connivance. Henry of Navarre and the Prince of Condé barely escape the same fate. This brings about the Fourth War of Religion in France.
 November 9 - Siege of Sancerre: Catholic forces of the king lay siege to Sancerre, a Huguenot stronghold in central France. The fortified city holds out for nearly eight months without bombard artillery. This is one of the last times that slings are used in European warfare.

Births

Deaths
 

 
 February 23 – Pierre Certon, French composer (b. c. 1510)
 August 24 through August 31 – Victims of the 'St. Bartholomew's Day massacre'-
 Gaspard de Coligny, French Protestant leader (b. 1519)
 Claude Goudimel, French composer (b. 1510)
 Pierre de la Ramée, French humanist scholar (b. 1515)
 Charles de Téligny, French soldier and diplomat (b. 1535)
 September – Denis Lambin, French classical scholar (b. 1520)
 December 22 – François Clouet, French miniaturist (b. c. 1510)

See also

References

1570s in France